David Todd may refer to:

 David Todd (architect) (1915–2008), American architect
 David Todd (producer), American record producer
 David Peck Todd (1855–1939), American astronomer
 David B. Todd Jr. (c. 1932-1980), American surgeon
 David Todd (haematologist) (1928–2017)

See also

David Tod (1805–1868), politician